Padraig Pearses GAA Club (Irish: CLG Padraig Mac Phiarsaigh) is a Gaelic Athletic Association club located in the parishes of Moore, Taughmaconnell and Creagh in County Roscommon, Ireland. They play in red and white colours and their home pitch is at Woodmount (Ton na lig), Creagh.

The club was founded in 1962 and was an amalgamation of the two former junior clubs, Moore and Taughmaconnell. Initially only men's Gaelic football was played, with the playing of Hurling restricted to the Creagh area of the club's catchment area. Eventually the club grew to cater for all GAA field codes including Ladies Gaelic football and Camogie

Padraig Pearses fields underage teams in almost all codes from U-8 to U-21 as well as Senior and Junior teams, in addition the club is active in the GAA Cultural Competitions of Scór and Scor ná nÓg. Pearses Senior hurler won the 2017 Roscommon senior title for the first time in thirty years.  The senior football team contested the Roscommon Senior Championship finals in 2015 and 2016 losing out on both days to Clan Na Gael and St Brigids. The senior football team won its first Roscommon Senior Championship final in 2019 defeating Roscommon Gaels on a scoreline of 2-10 to 1-10 and its second in 2021 defeating Clann na nGael on a scoreline of 2-08 to 0-11. That Team went on to win the club's first Connacht Senior Club Championship defeating Knockmore of Mayo by 1-13 to 1-11 in the final becoming only the 5th Roscommon club to hold a Senior Connacht title.

The club has provided players to county teams in both Hurling and Football at all levels. Current members of the senior Football squad (2020) are Niall Daly, Conor Daly, Ronan Daly, David Murray,  Hubert Darcy and Mark Richardson with Tomas Seale, Cathal Kelly and Adam Finnerty currently representing the club on the Hurling squad who won the Nicky Rackard Cup in 2015. Niall Carty was selected to captain the Roscommon senior footballers for 2014 and 2015.

Grounds

Although formed in 1962 the club had no grounds of its own until 1983. Up until then the club played its official games at Ballyforan (St. Aidans GAA Club) or Johnstown (Clan Na Gael GAA Club), The Club also used facilities such as Finneran's Field Taughmaconnell, Green's Field Moore, St Bridgets Hospital Grounds Creagh and the Pitch at the rear of the then Falty National School now the Home of Moore United Soccer Club.

However, after years of planning and fundraising, the club carried out a major development plan. The grounds at Woodmount, at the time, one of the finest in the country, were officially opened in 1984 by Dr. Donal Keenan, former President of the GAA and two time All-Ireland medal winner.

The original grounds consisted of one full size pitch and one training area. The club purchased additional land in the mid nineties and developed a further full size pitch along with a training area. In the early 2000s new dressing rooms were built adjoined to the old ones. This included 2 dressing rooms with showers and a gym which was later converted into two large dressing rooms, This expansion was necessary with the growth of Ladies Gaelic Football and Camogie within the club.
In recent times a new hurling wall and storage area has been built along with the expansion of the stand encompassing a press area. This has been made possible by the hard work of dedicated club members, with good support from the local Communities.

The grounds buildings presently consist of a Clubhouse, including members bar, offices and social hall, two Squash Courts, 6 full size dressing rooms, referees room, showers, toilets, storage sheds and a stand which includes a press area.
Playing and training facilities include two full-size playing fields both of which are floodlit, two training fields one floodlit, a hurling wall and a half-mile, sand running/amenity track.
The club currently holds the world record for the largest GAA training session of all time.

Roll of honour

Hurling
 Roscommon Senior Hurling Championship: 4
 1984, 1987, 2017, 2020
 Roscommon Senior Hurling League: 5
 1989, 1990, 2010, 2012, 2015
 Connacht Senior Hurling League: 1
 1987/88
 Roscommon Junior Hurling Championship: 7
 1975(Creagh), 1995,2002, 2003, 2004, 2011, 2017
 Roscommon U21 Hurling Championship: 10
 1997, 1998, 1999, 2002, 2014, 2015, 2016, 2017, 2018, 2022
 Roscommon Minor Hurling Championship: 8
 1996, 1999, 2001, 2011, 2012, 2015, 2016, 2018
 Roscommon Minor 9-aside Hurling Championship: 1
 2014
 Féile na nGael: 3
 1987, 1997(Division 3 Michael Cusack Trophy), 2012(Division 4 Dr Birch Trophy)

Ladies football
 Roscommon Ladies Senior Football Championship: 15
 1985, 1986, 1987, 1988, 1991, 1992, 1993, 1994, 1998, 1999, 2000, 2001, 2002, 2003, 2004.
 Roscommon Ladies Junior Football Championship: 1
 2015
 Roscommon Ladies Intermediate Football Championship: 1
 2016

Men's football
Connacht Senior Club Football Championship : 1
 2021
Roscommon Senior Football Championship : 2
 2019, 2021
 Roscommon Intermediate Football Championship: 1
 2011
 Connacht Leo Kenny Football Cup: 3
 2006, 2007, 2018
 Roscommon O'Rourke Cup (Division 1 Adult Football League): 3
 1969
 1985
 2021
 Roscommon O'Gara Cup (Division 2 Adult Football League): 1
 2012
 Roscommon Tansey Cup (Division 3 Adult Football League): ?
 ?
 Roscommon Lee Cup (Division 4 Adult Football League): 2
 2014, 2018
 Roscommon Division 5 Adult Football League: 0
 N/A
 Roscommon Division 6 Adult Football League: 1
 2018
 Roscommon Junior A Football Championship: 3
1994, 2000, 2022
 Roscommon Junior B Football Championship: 1
 1990
 Roscommon Mid South Junior A Football Championship: 1
 Roscommon Mid South Junior B Football Championship: 1
 2011,
 Roscommon Under 21 Football Championship: 4
 1975, 1991, 2001, 2010, 2022 Owwww

 Roscommon Minor Football Championship: 4
 1972, 1982, 2007, 2015
 Féile Peile na nÓg: 1
 2004 (Division 4, Limerick)

Camogie
 Roscommon Junior Camogie Championship: 3
2006, 2017, 2018
 Roscommon Minor A Championship:
2006
 Roscommon Minor B Championship: 
2007

County panelists

Men's football

Gallery

References

Hurling clubs in County Roscommon
Gaelic games clubs in County Roscommon
Gaelic football clubs in County Roscommon